Abingdon Presbytery is a part of the Presbyterian Church (U.S.A.) and within the Synod of Mid-Atlantic. Many of 55 churches are small, with less than 100 members.  The entire presbytery has approximately 4,500 members and almost 50 ministers.  The presbytery is named after a region in southwestern Virginia that includes 13 counties and the city of Abingdon, VA.(Map)

References

External links
 Official website at Synod of the Mid-Atlantic

Presbyterian Church (USA) presbyteries
Presbyterianism in Virginia